JSS Academy of Technical Education may refer to:

 J.S.S. Academy of Technical Education, Bangalore
 J.S.S. Academy of Technical Education, Noida